Trogodesmus is a genus of millipedes belonging to the family Paradoxosomatidae.

Species:

Trogodesmus bicolor 
Trogodesmus helvolus 
Trogodesmus nigrescens 
Trogodesmus uncinatus 
Trogodesmus vittatus

References

Paradoxosomatidae